Everything Is Forgotten is the second studio album by Australian art rock band Methyl Ethel, released in March 2017. The album peaked at number 16 on the ARIA Charts.

At the J Awards of 2017, the album was nominated for Australian Album of the Year.

At the 2017 West Australian Music Industry Awards, the album won Best Album.

It included the track "Ubu" which was voted into fourth place in the Triple J Hottest 100, 2017.

Reception

Emily Mackay from NME said "Everything Is Forgotten is at its best when it pairs... darkly danceable purpose with Ethel's strongest suit – their spookiness" and completed tracks such as "L’Heure Des Sorcières".

NME ranked the album as the 28th best album of 2017.

Track listing

Personnel 
 Jake Webb – instrumentation, producer, vocals, recording
 Thom Stewart – organ
 James Ford – drums, engineer, mixing, producer, synthesizer
 Noël Besson – vocals
 Holly Fewson – cover painting
 Phil Laslett – design

Charts

Release history

References

2017 albums
Methyl Ethel albums
Dot Dash Recordings albums
4AD albums